Erwin Cotton Mills Company Mill No. 1 Headquarters Building, also known as Erwin Square, is a historic textile mill complex located at Durham, Durham County, North Carolina. The mill was built in 1892, and is a two-story, 748 feet long, brick building. It features three square towers projecting from the east facade and by hundreds of large and closely spaced windows.  The building exemplifies "slow burn" construction with its exterior load bearing brick walls and its heavy timber heart pine beams and columns.  The headquarters building is a Late Victorian style brick building built in 1892 and enlarged in 1896 and 1905. Attached to the headquarters building is a warehouse.  In 1983–1984, the complex was renovated as offices and apartments.

It was listed on the National Register of Historic Places in 1984. It is located in the West Durham Historic District.

References

Textile mills in North Carolina
Industrial buildings and structures on the National Register of Historic Places in North Carolina
Victorian architecture in North Carolina
Industrial buildings completed in 1892
Buildings and structures in Durham, North Carolina
National Register of Historic Places in Durham County, North Carolina
Historic district contributing properties in North Carolina